Ambroise Dupont (born 11 May 1937) is a French politician and a former member of the Senate of France. He represented the Calvados department as a member of UMP political party.

References
Page on the Senate website

1937 births
Living people
French Senators of the Fifth Republic
Union for a Popular Movement politicians
Politicians from Normandy
People from Calvados (department)
Chevaliers of the Légion d'honneur
Senators of Calvados (department)